Chaharkuh Rural District is a rural district (dehestan) in the Central District of Kordkuy County, Golestan Province, Iran. At the 2006 census, its population was 11,685, in 3,002 families.  The rural district has 11 villages.

References 

Rural Districts of Golestan Province
Kordkuy County